Joses Asare-Akoto (born December 25, 1950) is a Ghanaian politician and a member of parliament of the Fifth Parliament of the Fourth Republic of Ghana. He represented the Asuogyaman Constituency in the Eastern Region on the ticket of the National Democratic Congress.

Early life and education 
Asare-Akoto hails from Akwamufie, a town in the  Eastern Region of Ghana. He attended the City and Guilds College in 1973.

Career 
Asare-Akoto was a Pastor at Church of Philadelphia International. Aside politics, he is a Reverend Minister by profession.

Politics 
Asare-Akoto is a member of the National Democratic Congress (NDC). He contested for the Asuogyaman constituency seat on the ticket of the NDC in the 2008 Ghanaian general elections and won. He was elected with 16,608 votes out of the 32,372 total valid votes cast, equivalent to 51.3% of total valid votes cast. He was elected over Kofi Osei-Ameyaw of the New Patriotic Party,  Slanzy Atsu Wornah of the People's National Convention and Agnes Deprah Ayensu of the Convention People's Party. These obtained 47.80%, 0.33% and 0.57% respectively of total valid votes cast.

Personal life
He identifies as a Christian (Church of Philadelphia International) and is married with five children.

References 

1950 births
Living people
National Democratic Congress (Ghana) politicians
People from Eastern Region (Ghana)
Ghanaian MPs 2009–2013